Guangxiao Temple is one of the oldest Buddhist temples in Guangzhou, the capital of China's Guangdong Province. As the special geographical position, Guangxiao Temple often acted as a stopover point for Asian missionary monks in the past. It also played a central role in propagating various elements of Buddhism, including precepts school, Chan (Zen), Shingon Buddhism, and Pure Land. In this temple, Huineng, the sixth Chinese patriarch of Chan Buddhism, made his first public Chan lecture and was tonsured, and Amoghavajra, a Shingon Buddhist master, gave his first teaching of esoteric Buddhism. Many Buddhist scriptures were also translated here, including those translated by Yijing and the Shurangama-sūtra translated by Paramitiin.

History

Han dynasty
Guangxiao originated from the residence of Zhao Jiande, the king of Nanyue whose usurpation prompted Emperor Wu of the Han (206 BC–8 AD) to invade and annex the area. During the Three Kingdoms, the Wu officer and scholar Yu Fan was banished to live at the residence. After Yu Fan died in 233, his family donated the estate, whose grounds were organized as the Zhizhi Temple. It was repeatedly renamed: the Wangyuanchaoyan Temple, the Wangyuan Temple, the Qianmingfaxing Temple, the Chongningwanshou Temple, and the Baoenguangxiaochan Temple.

Between the 4th and 10th centuries, many monks from South Asia (especially India) or mainland China came to the coastal Guangxiao Temple. During the period, Guangxiao Temple reached its peak. In the subsequent centuries, some eminent Chinese monks also visited or lived at Guangxiao Temple to propagate Buddhism, such as Danxia Tianran and Yangshan Huiji.

Ming dynasty
In 1482, the Chenghua Emperor of the Ming dynasty renamed it Guangxiao Temple and personally recorded the new name on a stele. Since then, the temple has kept the name "Guangxiao".

Qing dynasty
In the 17th century, Guangxiao Temple fell into decline, although it underwent minor restoration several times.

Modern China
In the last two centuries, Guangxiao Temple was fatally damaged by the movement to "Requisition Temple Property to Promote Education" (1898–1931) and the Cultural Revolution (1966–1976). Over this period, most of the buildings of Guangxiao Temple were either destroyed or occupied for secular usage.

In the 1980s, Guangxiao Temple was reoccupied by Buddhist monks. Since then, some of its main halls have been rebuilt, such as the Mahavira Hall, Samghrma Hall, and Ksitigarbha Hall. ‘Dharma pillars’ have also been erected in front of each hall. In addition, an animal liberation pond has been built near these structures. These reconstructed buildings have restored Guangxiao Temple to some extent, however the scale of the temple today is much smaller than in the past.

The temple's records are principally recorded in a thread-bound edition entitled The Annals of Guangxiao Temple, written in 1769.

Architecture
The extant buildings and halls include the Shanmen, Four Heavenly Kings Hall, Mahavira Hall, Hair Burying Pagoda, etc.

Mahavira Hall
The Mahavira Hall was originally built in 401 in the Eastern Jin dynasty (317–420) by senior monk Dharmayasas from Western Regions. Flat and far-reaching, the eaves of the hall can adapt to the high temperature and heavy rains in the south China and the beams and pillars can avoid erosion by wind and rain. Instead of brick walls, the hall is surrounded by wooden windows which are engraved with flower patterns. Some of the windows are decorated with translucent shells, which dissipate heat, ventilate and collect light well. The hall houses statues of Sakyamuni, Amitabha and Maitreya.

Great Compassion Column
The Great Compassion Column stands in front of the Mahavira Hall. It was made in 826 during the reign of Emperor Jingzong of the Tang dynasty (618–907). Octagonal in shape, it has elegant style with a mushroom-shaped canopy on the top and engraved relief of Hercules at the bottom base. The Great Compassion Mantra in Sanskrit and Chinese are inscribed on the body.

Hair Burying Pagoda
Under the Bodhi tree behind the Mahavira Hall, there is the Hair Burying Pagoda. In 676 during the Yifeng era (676–679) in the Tang dynasty (618–907), master Huineng cut his hair and received ordination as a monk. Abbot Yinzong buried his hair here and built a pagoda to commemorate it.

East Tower and West Tower
Two iron pagoda are erected behind the Mahavira Hall, which are the oldest existing iron towers in China. Built in the 963 in the Southern Han dynasty (907–960), the original West Tower was seven stories but now only preserves the bottom three floors.

The East Tower was built in the 967 in the Southern Han dynasty (907–960) by Emperor Liu Chang. Over 900 exquisite niches with small statues of Buddha are carved on the body of the pagoda. When first built, it was covered with gold and known as Gilded Thousand Buddha Pagoda.

Transportation
The temple is accessible within walking distance north of Ximenkou Station of Guangzhou Metro.

Gallery

See also
 Chinese Buddhism
 List of Buddhist temples
 Six Banyan Temple
 Hualin Temple (Guangzhou)
 Hoi Tong Monastery
 Benhuan

References

Bibliography
 
 

Buddhist temples in Guangzhou
Yuexiu District
Major National Historical and Cultural Sites in Guangdong